Choe Song-hui (born 7 May 1980) is a North Korean diver. She competed in the women's 3 metre springboard event at the 2000 Summer Olympics.

References

1980 births
Living people
North Korean female divers
Olympic divers of North Korea
Divers at the 2000 Summer Olympics
Place of birth missing (living people)